Chananya Yom Tov Lipa is a Jewish given name, and may refer to:

 Rabbi Chananya Yom Tov Lipa Teitelbaum, leader in the Satmar Hasidic dynasty
 Rabbi Chananya Yom Tov Lipa Goldman, a renowned Orthodox rabbi

Jewish masculine given names